Aepopsis robinii is a species of beetle in the family Carabidae, the only species in the genus Aepopsis.

References

Trechinae